Among Grey Stones is a 1983 Soviet drama film directed by Kira Muratova. The film suffered a lot from the Soviet censorship and was edited without the acceptance of Muratova, so she refused to release it under her name - it was attributed to "Ivan Sidorov" (a common Russian name and surname). It was screened in the Un Certain Regard section at the 1988 Cannes Film Festival.

Cast
 Igor Sharapov as Vasya
 Oksana Shlapak as Marusya
 Stanislav Govorukhin as judge
 Roman Levchenko as Valyok
 Sergei Popov as Valentin
 Viktor Aristov as beggar
 Viktor Gogolev as Jean
 Fyodor Nikitin as Professor
 Vladimir Pozhidayev as General
 Nina Ruslanova as housekeeper

References

External links

Soviet drama films
1980s Russian-language films
1983 drama films
1983 films
Films directed by Kira Muratova
Odesa Film Studio films